"Can't Help Myself" is a song recorded by Canadian country music artists Dean Brody and the Reklaws. It was independently released in February 2020 through Brody’s label, Scurvy Dog Music. The song was written by Tyler Hubbard and Brian Kelley of Florida Georgia Line, along with Blake Redferrin, Jason E. Afable, and Rocky Block.

Critical reception
Matthew Weaver of Corus Radio called the song the "perfect summer tune" that "gets the party started".

Music video
The music video was directed by Ben Knechtel and premiered on March 11, 2020. The video was filmed in Toronto, Ontario, and featured Brody, the Reklaws, and fans who were able to enter a casting call. It also featured a can of Brody’s new beer, "Hucklejack Canadian Lager".

Commercial performance
"Can’t Help Myself" peaked at number 49 on the Canadian Hot 100 for the week of June 6, 2020. It was a Number One hit on the Billboard Canada Country chart for the same week while setting a record as the most played song ever at Canadian country radio in a single week on the Nielsen BDS charts with 1782 spins, a record later broken that year by Brody's Canadian Summer. The song has been certified Platinum by Music Canada. As of May 2021, the song had received over 13.8 million streams through Spotify.

Charts

Certifications

References

Songs about alcohol
2020 songs
2020 singles
Dean Brody songs
The Reklaws songs
Songs written by Brian Kelley (musician)
Songs written by Tyler Hubbard
Songs written by Blake Redferrin
Song recordings produced by Todd Clark
Vocal collaborations